Juan Miguel Igartua Narvaiza (born April 29, 1951) is a former Spanish handball player. He competed in the 1972 Summer Olympics.

In 1972 he was part of the Spanish team that finished 15th in the Olympic tournament. He played four matches.

References

1951 births
Living people
Spanish male handball players
Olympic handball players of Spain
Handball players at the 1972 Summer Olympics